Flecha de oro is a 1940 Argentine film directed by Carlos F. Borcosque and starring Pepe Arias and Gloria Grey.

Cast
 Pepe Arias 
 Gloria Grey 
 Juana Sujo 
 Pablo Palitos 
 Ricardo Grau 
 Felisa Mary 
 Tito Gómez 
 Mecha López 
 Semillita 
 Agustín Barrios 
 Ernesto Villegas 
 Lalo Malcolm 
 Salvador Sinaí 
 Inés Edmonson 
 Adrián Cuneo 
 Pepe Biondi 
 Elisa Labardén

References

External links
 

1940 films
1940s Spanish-language films
Argentine black-and-white films
1940 comedy films
Films directed by Carlos F. Borcosque
Argentine comedy films
1940s Argentine films